Sindo may refer to:
 Sindo County, North Pyongan Province, North Korea
 Sindo (island), an island off Incheon, South Korea
 Sindo (religion), "way of the gods", a name of Korean folk religion or shamanism
 Sindo, Kenya, a neighboring town of Mbita Point
 The Sindo, a nickname for the Irish newspaper Sunday Independent (Ireland)
 Koran Sindo, an Indonesian newspaper
 SINDO, a method in quantum chemistry
 SINDOtv, former name of an Indonesian television network iNews